The 38th International 500-Mile Sweepstakes was held at the Indianapolis Motor Speedway on Monday, May 31, 1954. The event was part of the 1954 AAA National Championship Trail, and was also race 2 of 9 in the 1954 World Championship of Drivers.

Time trials
Time trials was scheduled for four days.

Saturday May 15 – Pole Day time trials
Sunday May 16 – Second day time trials
Saturday May 22 – Third day time trials 
Sunday May 23 – Fourth day time trials

Starting grid 
 = Indianapolis 500 rookie;  = Former Indianapolis 500 winner

Alternates
First alternate: Eddie Johnson (#26) — Johnson drove relief during the race

Failed to qualify

Henry Banks (#26) - Retired
Joe Barzda (#54)
Bill Boyd  (#47)
Wally Campbell  (#66, #81) - Failed rookie test
Bob Christie  (#66)
George Connor (#27, #32) - Retired
Ray Crawford  (#32) - Entry declined
Jimmy Davies (#53)
Billy Devore (#93)
Duke Dinsmore (#62, #67)
Walt Faulkner (#44, #97)
Pat Flaherty (#39, #76, #89)
Johnny Fedricks  (#89)
George Fonder (#33, #36)
Potsy Goacher  (#67)
Cliff Griffith (#22)
Al Herman  (#36)
Bill Holland (#38)
Frank Mundy  (#41)
Duke Nalon (#8)
Danny Oakes  (#47, #49)
Eddie Russo  (#37)
Eddie Sachs  (#54)
Bob Scott (#18, #21)
Joe Sostilio  (#45)
Marshall Teague (#3)
George Tichenor  (#22)
Johnnie Tolan  (#69)
Lee Wallard (#99) - Retired
Leroy Warriner (#67) - Withdrew, injured
Chuck Weyant  (#52)

Race summary 
Bill Vukovich had to work much harder in this race due to his car was now 2 years old and the team had trouble getting it up to speed leading to a 19th place starting spot inside of row 7 for the race. Vukovich did not see the lead until lap 61 when he led 1 lap. He then after losing positions during pitstops worked his way forward, seeing the lead again on lap 92 leading for the next 38 laps until falling back due to another round of pitstops. Then Vukovich took the lead for good on 150 to win his second consecutive 500, setting a record (at the time) 130.840 mph average race speed. The record would stand until the 1957 Indianapolis 500. Sadly Vukovich died the following year attempting to win his third consecutive Indy 500. The race reportedly went 110 laps before the first yellow light.

Box score 

Notes
 – Includes 1 point for fastest lead lap

Additional stats 
 Pole position: Jack McGrath – 4:15.26 (4 laps)
 Pole Speed: 141.033 mph (average for 4 laps)
 Fastest Lead Lap: Jack McGrath – 1:04.04 (140.540 mph)
 Relief drivers:
 Troy Ruttman (130 laps) & Duane Carter (70) shared car no 34. Shared points for 4th position.
 Paul Russo (150) & Jerry Hoyt (50) shared car no 5.
 Art Cross (120), Jimmie Davies (30), Johnnie Parsons (22), Andy Linden (17) & Sam Hanks (11) shared car no 45.
 Chuck Stevenson (82), Walt Faulkner (117) shared car no 98.
 Duane Carter (76), Jimmy Jackson (57), Tony Bettenhausen (34) & Marshall Teague (29) shared car no 16.
 Ed Elisian (148) & Bob Scott (45) shared car no 27.
 Frank Armi (179) & George Fonder (14) shared car no 71.
 Sam Hanks (112), Jimmie Davies (36) & Jim Rathmann (43) shared car no 1.
 Rodger Ward (105) & Eddie Johnson (67) shared car no 12.
 Gene Hartley (151) & Marshall Teague (17) shared car no 31.
 Andy Linden (113) & Bob Scott (52) shared car no 74.
 Johnny Thomson (113), Andy Linden (27) & Jimmy Daywalt (25) shared car no 43.
 Jim Rathmann (95) & Pat Flaherty (15) shared car no 38.
 Spider Webb (54) & Danny Kladis (50) shared car no 65.
 Len Duncan (43) & George Fonder (58) shared car no 33.

Broadcasting

Radio
The race was carried live flag-to-flag on the Indianapolis Motor Speedway Radio Network. It was the second time the race was carried in its entirety. The broadcast was anchored by Sid Collins, his third as chief announcer, and seventh year overall with the crew. Charlie Brockman served as booth analyst and statistician, and also reported from victory lane.

Of note, the network expanded its coverage to include four qualifying wrap-up shows during time trials weekends.

The network expanded to include four qualifying wrap-up shows, and the number of affiliate stations increased to 210. All five major radio stations in Indianapolis carried the broadcast. The 1954 broadcast is notable in that it featured for the first time the famous phrase "Stay tuned for the Greatest Spectacle in Racing." Due to the increased number of affiliates at the time, the network needed a scripted "out-cue" to alert producers when to manually insert local commercials. A young WIBC marketing staff member named Alice Greene (née Bunger) is credited with inventing the phrase, and chief announcer Sid Collins coined it on-air. It has been used ever since, with all of the chief announcers proudly reciting it during their respective tenures.

Championship standings after the race 
World Drivers' Championship standings

Note: Only the top five positions are included.

Gallery

References

External links
Indianapolis 500 History: Race & All-Time Stats – Official Site
1954 Indianapolis 500 at RacingReference.info (Relief driver statistics)

Indianapolis 500
Indianapolis 500
Indianapolis 500 races
Indianapolis 500
1954 in American motorsport